Cory Paterson (born May 24, 1995) is a Canadian artistic gymnast.

In 2018, both Paterson and James Hall won the silver medal in the men's horizontal bar event at the 2018 Commonwealth Games held in Gold Coast, Australia. Paterson also won the silver medal in the men's artistic team all-around event.

In 2019, he represented Canada at the 2019 Pan American Games held in Lima, Peru and he won the bronze medal in the men's artistic individual all-around event. He also won the bronze medal in the men's artistic team all-around event.

References

External links 
 

Living people
1995 births
Place of birth missing (living people)
Canadian male artistic gymnasts
Gymnasts at the 2018 Commonwealth Games
Commonwealth Games silver medallists for Canada
Commonwealth Games medallists in gymnastics
Gymnasts at the 2019 Pan American Games
Pan American Games medalists in gymnastics
Pan American Games bronze medalists for Canada
Medalists at the 2019 Pan American Games
21st-century Canadian people
Medallists at the 2018 Commonwealth Games